The Bundesstraße 49 is a German federal highway. It forms part of E40 and E44, running from Alsfeld, Hesse to Langsur, Rhineland-Palatinate near the Luxembourg border.

References

49
Roads in Hesse
Roads in Rhineland-Palatinate